Dean Marshall is a Canadian film, television, and theater, actor, writer, and director. He is known for portraying Sgt. Bates on Syfy original series Stargate Atlantis, and Carter on both Da Vinci's Inquest, and Da Vinci's City Hall.

Early life

Marshall began performing at a young age in a steel band. His family was originally from Trinidad and Tobago, but immigrated to Canada before he was born. He was born and raised in a Montreal suburb.

Career
Before acting he joined the Canadian Forces at age 18, and served for some 6 years. Since 1993, he acts, writes and directs in the television, film, and theater business. Marshall has taken on diverse roles ranging from Malcolm Bridges, the crazy fearless officer, in the action packed adventurer film Babylon 5: The Legend of the Rangers, to the smart laid-back Detective Carter in Da Vinci's City Hall.

Since his career took off in 1993, Marshall resides in Vancouver.

Filmography

As of August 30, 2012, Marshall appeared in 37 different TV, and films, since his career started in 1993.

Theater

As of 2013, Marshall appeared in three theater roles either as an actor, writer or director.

Voice work

As of 2013, Marshall voiced in one video game.

References

External links

Biography at Da Vinci Online

Living people
Black Canadian male actors
Canadian male film actors
Canadian people of Trinidad and Tobago descent
Canadian male television actors
Canadian male voice actors
Male actors from Montreal
Year of birth missing (living people)